

The 19th Waffen Grenadier Division of the SS (2nd Latvian) was an infantry division of the Waffen-SS during World War II. It was the second Latvian division formed in January 1944, after its sister unit, the 15th Waffen Grenadier Division of the SS (1st Latvian) with which it formed the Latvian Legion. It was surrounded in the Courland Pocket at the end of the war where it surrendered to the Red Army.

The division was formed in January 1944, from 2 SS Infantry Brigades with the addition of a newly raised third regiment, Waffen Grenadier Regiment 46 (Latvian No. 6). Simultaneously, the designations of the two other grenadier regiments were changed from 39 and 40 to 42 and 43 respectively. The commander of the SS brigade, SS-Oberführer Hinrich Schuldt became the first commander of the division. After Schuldt was killed in action on 15 March 1944, SS-Standartenführer Friedrich-Wilhelm Bock temporarily took command, being replaced on April 13 by SS-Oberführer Bruno Streckenbach, who led the division until the end of war.

See also
 List of Waffen-SS units
 Ranks and insignia of the Waffen-SS
 Waffen-SS foreign volunteers and conscripts

References

19
Military history of Latvia during World War II
Military units and formations established in 1944
Foreign conscript units of the Waffen-SS
Infantry divisions of the Waffen-SS
Latvian Legion
Military units and formations disestablished in 1945
Generalbezirk Lettland